The 2019–20 ABA League Second Division was the 3rd season of the ABA Second Division with 12 teams from Bosnia and Herzegovina, Croatia, Montenegro, North Macedonia, Serbia, and Slovenia participating in it.

On 12 March 2020, the ABA League Assembly temporarily suspended its competitions due to the COVID-19 pandemic. On 27 May 2020, the ABA League Assembly canceled definitely its competitions due to the COVID-19 pandemic. The ABA League Assembly decided not to recognize any team as the champion for the season, and decided to award the two wild cards for the 2020–21 ABA First League season to Borac Čačak and Split.

Teams

Team allocation
The labels in the parentheses show how each team qualified for the place of its starting round:
 1st, 2nd, etc.: National League position after Playoffs
 WC: Wild card

Venues and locations

Personnel and sponsorship

Coaching changes

Regular season

League table

Positions by round

Results

MVP of the Round

Source: ABA League

See also 
 List of current ABA League Second Division team rosters
 2019–20 ABA League First Division

2019–20 domestic competitions
  2019–20 Basketball League of Serbia
  2019–20 HT Premijer liga
  2019–20 Slovenian Basketball League
  2019–20 Prva A liga
  2019–20 Basketball Championship of Bosnia and Herzegovina
  2019–20 Macedonian First League

References

External links 
 Official website
 ABA League at Eurobasket.com

ABA Second Division seasons
2019–20 in European second tier basketball leagues
2019–20 in Serbian basketball
2019–20 in Slovenian basketball
2019–20 in Croatian basketball
2019–20 in Bosnia and Herzegovina basketball
2019–20 in Montenegrin basketball
2019–20 in North Macedonia basketball
Basketball events curtailed and voided due to the COVID-19 pandemic